Dmitri Svatkovskiy (born 27 November 1971) is a Russian modern pentathlete, Olympic champion and politician.

Olympics
Svatkovskiy competed for Russia at the 2000 Summer Olympics in Sydney, where he won an individual gold medal. He won a team silver medal with the Unified team at the 1992 Summer Olympics in Barcelona.

Svatkovskiy decided to retire from sports after the 2000 Olympics and worked as a modern pentathlon coach for a short while before going to politics. From 2006-10, Svatkovskiy worked as the minister of economics of the Nizhny Novgorod Oblast and since 2010 has been the deputy governor of the Nizhny Novgorod Oblast. Since 2006 he has worked as the president of European Modern Pentathlon Federation and is the president of the charitable organization, Five Rings, which provides health and social protection for retired athletes.

He was married to former rhythmic gymnast, Olympic bronze medalist Oxana Skaldina, their daughter Daria Svatkovskaya (b. 1996) is also a rhythmic gymnast.

In September 2018, Svatkovsky was elected Member of the State Duma from Nizhny Novgorod constituency at the by-election.

References

External links
 

1971 births
Living people
Soviet male modern pentathletes
Russian male modern pentathletes
Olympic modern pentathletes of the Unified Team
Olympic modern pentathletes of Russia
Modern pentathletes at the 1992 Summer Olympics
Modern pentathletes at the 1996 Summer Olympics
Modern pentathletes at the 2000 Summer Olympics
Olympic silver medalists for the Unified Team
Olympic gold medalists for Russia
Sportspeople from Moscow
Olympic medalists in modern pentathlon
Medalists at the 2000 Summer Olympics
Medalists at the 1992 Summer Olympics
Seventh convocation members of the State Duma (Russian Federation)
Russian Presidential Academy of National Economy and Public Administration alumni